Atlantic Bank and Trust Company Building, also known as the North Carolina National Bank Building, is a historic bank building located in Burlington, Alamance County, North Carolina. It was designed by architect Charles C. Hartmann and built in 1928–1929. It is a nine-story, steel-framed midrise in the Art Deco style. It features rich granite ornamentation at the bottom and top pairs of stories.

It was added to the National Register of Historic Places in 1984. It is located in the Downtown Burlington Historic District.

References

Bank buildings on the National Register of Historic Places in North Carolina
Art Deco architecture in North Carolina
Commercial buildings completed in 1929
Buildings and structures in Burlington, North Carolina
National Register of Historic Places in Alamance County, North Carolina
Individually listed contributing properties to historic districts on the National Register in North Carolina